Inner Sanctum is a 30-minute American television anthology series based upon Inner Sanctum Mystery, the radio series of the same name. Thirty-nine episodes aired on the National Broadcasting Company in the 1953-1954 season.  It was created and produced by Himan Brown.  Its host/narrator was Paul McGrath.

Guest stars included Kim Stanley, Jack Klugman, Beatrice Straight, Jack Warden, Martin Balsam, Jo Van Fleet, E.G. Marshall, and Mildred Dunnock.

External links
Inner Sanctum (TV series) at CVTA with episode list

1950s American anthology television series
1953 American television series debuts
1954 American television series endings
Black-and-white American television shows
NBC original programming
American mystery television series